Cladonia sobolescens, commonly known as the peg lichen, is a species of fruticose lichen. It is found in temperate eastern North America and East Asia.

Taxonomy
Cladonia sobolescens is classified in the section Helopodium of genus Cladonia. According to Finnish lichenologist Teuvo Ahti, Vainio's Cladonia clavulifera is a synonym. Cladonia sobolescens is commonly known as the "peg lichen".

Description
The primary squamules of Cladonia sobolescens are rounded to strap-shaped, and range in color from greyish to green to brown, depending on the degree of sun exposure it has had. When growing vertically, a white lower surface may become exposed. The podetia, which lack cups or soredia, are short and peg-like, rarely branching once or twice near the tips.

The lichen contains fumarprotocetraric acid as its main secondary metabolite, and a smaller amount of protocetraric acid. It is a fumarprotocetraric acid chemotype of Cladonia subcariosa.

Habitat and distribution
Cladonia sobolescens is found in temperate eastern North America and East Asia. The northern limit of its North American range extends to Prince Edward Island in Canada.

See also
List of Cladonia species

References

sobolescens
Lichen species
Lichens described in 1887
Lichens of Asia
Lichens of North America
Taxa named by Edvard August Vainio